Cropwell Bishop is a village and civil parish in the borough of Rushcliffe in Nottinghamshire. The population taken at the 2011 Census was 1,853. The village has one of a select six creameries that produce Stilton cheese.

Geography
It is 1.2 miles to the east of the A46 in the NG12 postcode. The next village to the north is Cropwell Butler. Both villages form part of the Vale of Belvoir. The Grantham Canal runs along the edge of the village.

History
Composed of 12 households, Crophille was in Bingham Wapentake in 1086. In the 12th or 13th century, the wapentake became known as Bingham Hundred until the end of the 19th century.

The Cinema Museum in London holds film of a point-to-point held at the village  on April 14th 1952.

References

External links

 Primary School
 Cropwell Bishop Stilton
 Parish church
 Scout Group

Villages in Nottinghamshire
Rushcliffe